Arutyunov or Arutiunov (feminine: Arutyunova, Arutiunova) is a Russian-language Armenian patronymic surname derived from the Russified Armenian given name Arutyun (Harutyun) with the Russian Patronymic suffix -ov. The native Armenian patronymic is Harutyunyan (various transliterations). Notable people with the surname include:

Albert Arutiunov
Aram Arutyunov
Georges Arutyunov
Grigory Arutyunov
Karekin Arutyunov
Valery Arutyunov

Surnames of Armenian origin
Russian-language surnames
Patronymic surnames